Justin Wood (born 18 December 1979) is a former Australian rules footballer who played for Geelong in the Australian Football League (AFL) in 1998. He was recruited from the Tassie Mariners in the TAC Cup with the 54th selection in the 1997 AFL Draft.  He also played for the Glenorchy in the Tasmanian Football League (TFL).  He was later rookie listed by Western Bulldogs in the 2000 Rookie Draft, but never played in the AFL for the Bulldogs.

References

External links

Living people
1979 births
Geelong Football Club players
Tassie Mariners players
Glenorchy Football Club players
Australian rules footballers from Tasmania
Peel Thunder Football Club players